Chryseobacterium camelliae  is a Gram-negative, strictly aerobic, rod-shaped and non-motile bacteria from the genus of Chryseobacterium which has been isolated from green tea in Jangheung-gun in Korea.

References

Further reading 
 

camelliae
Bacteria described in 2014